Wbn may refer to:
 Wiesbaden, the capital of Hesse, Germany

WbN may refer to:
 West by North, as a compass point in Boxing the compass (WbN)
 Werewolf by Night, a Marvel Comics character
 Werewolf by Night (TV special), a television special produced by Marvel Studios based on the comics character

wBN may refer to:
 Wurtzite Boron nitride (w-BN)

WBN may refer to:
 The WB Television Network

See also
WBNS (disambiguation)